The adjective iconic may describe:
 someone or something that is seen  as a cultural icon
 a sign characterised by iconicity
 an image or technique typical of religious icons

Iconic may also refer to:
 Iconic (EP), a 2012 extended play by Icona Pop
 Iconic, the working title for Rebel Heart, a 2015 studio album by Madonna
 "Iconic" (song), a 2015 song by Madonna featuring Chance the Rapper and Mike Tyson
 "Iconic", a 2018 song by Logic featuring Jaden Smith from YSIV
 "Iconic", a 2018 song by Poppy from Am I a Girl?
 "Iconic", a 2019 song by Trisha Paytas
 "Iconic", a 2021 song by Aespa from Savage
 "Iconic", a 2021 song by Bad Gyal from Warm Up
 "Iconic", a 2022 song by Simple Plan from Harder Than It Looks
 Iconic (concert), a 2019 concert tour by Filipino singers Sharon Cuneta and Regine Velasquez

See also 
 Icon (disambiguation)